Joshua D. Miller is an American psychologist and personality researcher. He is a professor of psychology in the University of Georgia's Franklin College of Arts and Sciences, as well as the director for the Department of Psychology's Clinical Training Program there. He is known for researching narcissism.

Honors and awards
Miller received the Theodore Millon Award in Personality Psychology from the American Psychological Foundation in 2016.

References

External links
Faculty page

Living people
21st-century American psychologists
University of Georgia faculty
Binghamton University alumni
University of Kentucky alumni
Year of birth missing (living people)